Jonchery-sur-Vesle (literally Jonchery on Vesle) is a commune in the Marne department in north-eastern France. Jonchery-sur-Vesle station has rail connections to Reims and Fismes.

See also
Communes of the Marne department

References

Joncherysurvesle